
climm (previously mICQ) is a free CLI-based instant messaging client that runs on a wide variety of platforms, including AmigaOS, BeOS, Windows (using either Cygwin or MinGW), OS X, NetBSD/OpenBSD/FreeBSD, Linux, Solaris, HP-UX, and AIX.

Functionality 

climm has many of the features the official ICQ client has, and more:

 It has support for SSL-encrypted direct connection compatible with licq and SIM.
 It supports OTR encrypted messages.
 It is internationalized; German, English, and other translations are available, and it supports sending and receiving acknowledged and non-acknowledged Unicode-encoded messages (it even understands UTF-8 messages for message types the ICQ protocol does not use them for).
 It is capable of running several UINs at the same time and is very configurable (e.g. different colors for incoming messages from different contacts or for different accounts).
 Due to its command-line interface, it has good usability for blind users through text-to-speech interfaces or Braille devices. 

climm also supports basic functionality of the XMPP protocol.

History 
Climm was originally developed as mICQ by Matt D. Smith as public domain software. Starting with mICQ 0.4.8 it was licensed under the GPLv2, not much of the original PD code remained since then. All later additions were made by Rüdiger Kuhlmann, in particular, the support for the ICQ v8 protocol. mICQ was renamed to climm ("Command Line Interface Multi Messenger") with version change to 0.6. CLimm was relicensed to include the OpenSSL exception.

See also 

 Comparison of instant messaging clients

References 

Notes
  Andreas Kneib (Feb 2004) Der direkte Draht. ICQ in der Kommandozeile (Direct  Line. ICQ in the  command line), LinuxUser

Further reading 
 Jonathan Corbet (February 18, 2003) The trojaning of mICQ, lwn.net

External links 
 
 ICQ protocol page

Instant messaging clients for Linux
MacOS instant messaging clients
Windows instant messaging clients
Amiga instant messaging clients
Free instant messaging clients
Cross-platform software
Free software programmed in C
Public-domain software with source code